Carlos Augusto Lobatón Espejo (born February 6, 1980 in Baranquilla, Colombia) is a retired Peruvian footballer who played as a midfielder.

Club career
Lobatón first developed as footballer in the popular Academia Cantolao along with his brother Abel Lobatón, at the age of 7. There he had as his first coach Víctor "El Chino" Rivera. Lobatón later joined the renowned youth system of Sporting Cristal. At the age of 18, he was loaned to Sport Boys. In 1998, he made his professional debut wearing their famous pink jersey. Later he played for various clubs in the Peruvian league until arriving at Cienciano. There he would find both national and international success. In 2003, he helped Cienciano win the Copa Sudamericana beating River Plate in the final. In the following year he also won the Recopa Sudamericana this time defeating Boca Juniors. Then in 2005 he won the Peruvian Torneo Apertura with Cienciano. Later in the second half of the 2005 season he returned to Sporting Cristal and helped them win the 2005 Torneo Clausura. In 2007, he suffered burns on the soles of his feet after playing on artificial turf or artificial pitch in the blazing sun.

In the last years, Carlos Lobatón has been an emblatic player in Sporting Cristal. He has played in the club for the last 10 years, winning the national championship four times (2005, 2012, 2014, 2016) and scoring amazing goals.

Retirement and later career
Lobatón retired from football at the end of 2019 and was hired in the management of his last club, Sporting Cristal.

International career
In 2005 Lobatón made his first national team appearance for Peru. Throughout much of his international career his appearances were sporadic. However on November 12, 2010, after a three year absence,  the new Peruvian national team coach Sergio Markarián called him up to play in a friendly against Colombia. He started in the 1–1 draw versus Colombia, which was Peru's final game of 2010. On June 29, 2011 current coach Sergio Markarián included Lobatón in his squad to participate in the 2011 Copa America. On July 16, 2011, in the quarterfinal match of the Copa America versus Colombia, he scored the winning goal in extra time that sent Peru to the semifinals.

Career statistics

1 CONMEBOL competitions include the Copa Libertadores and Copa Sudamericana

References

1980 births
Living people
Footballers from Lima
Peruvian footballers
Peru international footballers
Peruvian Primera División players
Sport Boys footballers
Estudiantes de Medicina footballers
Club Universitario de Deportes footballers
Unión Huaral footballers
Cienciano footballers
Sporting Cristal footballers
2011 Copa América players
2015 Copa América players
Association football midfielders